Greg Mortimer is a cruise ship owned and operated by Aurora Expeditions. The ship was named in honour of the company's founder Greg Mortimer, in a combined naming and delivery ceremony at CMHI's Haimen base on 6 September 2019.

Design and description 
The ship is a  expedition ship with a state of the art x-bow design which has a piercing effect on smaller waves, making for a smoother ride. It has 80 cabins.

Construction and career 
The ship was named after the Australian mountaineer, polar explorer and founder of Aurora Expeditions, Greg Mortimer. Mortimer arguably became best known as one of the first two Australians (with Tim Macartney-Snape) to successfully climb Mount Everest, on 3 October 1984.

COVID-19 pandemic

On 7 April 2020, the cruise ship, which holds up to 216 passengers, became stranded in South American waters, asking for help after people exhibited symptoms such as fever, which prompted authorities to ban them from disembarking. Uruguay was the only country which allowed the cruise ship to dock, after Uruguayan medical teams boarded the cruise ship to test passengers on 1 April, 81 people tested positive for COVID-19. Six people found seriously ill with coronavirus were evacuated and transferred to a hospital in Montevideo.

The ship received permission to dock and Uruguayan authorities arranged an evacuation flight to Australia and New Zealand. By that time 128 persons on the vessel had tested positive for COVID-19. Six had transferred to a hospital in Montevideo. Passengers from Europe and America who had positive tests would not be allowed to travel to their home countries until their subsequent tests indicated negative results. On the night of 10 April some passengers were evacuated in order to fly to Australia. On 18 April, a 52-year-old Filipino crewman died of the coronavirus.

References

External links
Greg Mortimer at Faergelejet.dk

Cruise ships involved in the COVID-19 pandemic
Cruise ships
Cruise ships of Australia
Ships built in China
2019 ships
2020 in Uruguay